Doug Christie may refer to:

Doug Christie (basketball) (born 1970), American basketball player
Doug Christie (lawyer) (1946–2013), Canadian lawyer and activist